Plzeň main railway station (abbreviated Plzeň hl.n.) is the principal railway station in Pilsen, the largest city in western Bohemia. The station is located in the Slovany district near the city center. The station was opened in 1862, together with the Czech Western Railway from Prague to Pilsen. The station has six platforms for train transport and one platform for buses. There are also tram and trolleybus stops. The station is electrified.

As of 8. March 2023, the station is undergoing major reconstruction.

History 

The current building of the Pilsen main railway station was opened in 1907. It is an art nouveau building designed by Rudolf Štech. Rudolf Štech also co-financed construction of the railway building and due to debt, he committed suicide in 1908.

On April 17, 1945, the building was heavily damaged during the bombing of Pilsen by the US Army Air Forces. The bombing killed 347 people inside the station building. After World War II the building was reconstructed to its original state.

In the 1950s the building was renamed as Pilsen Gottwald station (Cz: Plzeň Gottwaldovo nádraží) in honor of the first Czechoslovak communist president Klement Gottwald. In the 1960s, the station was electrified as part of line electrification to České Budějovice. After the Velvet Revolution the station regained its original name.

Since 2000 the building is a Czech cultural heritage site.

In 2012, the interiors of the station building were partially reconstructed. In 2013 the first underpass for pedestrians was extended to connect Železniční street and Šumavská street with the station building. In December 2018, a bus terminal was opened next to the train station. There is a newly built second underpass, which connects the bus terminal with platforms. In the years 2021–2023, a major reconstruction of the station building is planned.

Train services
Pilsen is an important centre of Czech railway transport, with the crossing of five main railway lines:
 line Nr. 170: Prague – Beroun – Pilsen – Cheb
 line Nr. 180: Pilsen – Domažlice – Furth im Wald (Germany)
 line Nr. 183: Pilsen – Klatovy – Železná Ruda
 line Nr. 160: Pilsen – Žatec
 line Nr. 190: Pilsen – České Budějovice

Local transport 

The station is served by tram lines 1 and 2. There are also numerous trolleybus lines.

References

Buildings and structures in Plzeň
Railway stations in Plzeň Region
Railway stations opened in 1862
Art Nouveau railway stations